Margi Preus is an American children's writer. She is a 2011 Newbery Honor winner and won the Asian/Pacific American Award for Literature for Heart of a Samurai. Her books have won multiple awards, honored as ALA/ALSC Notables, landed on many "best of" lists, featured on NPR, chosen for community reads, and translated into many languages.*

She earned her undergraduate degree at Luther College and graduate degree from Binghamton University.
She taught at The College of St. Scholastica, University of Minnesota Duluth.
She lives in Duluth, Minnesota.

Works
Storm's Coming!, Illustrator David Geister, MHS Press, 2016, -0
The Bamboo Sword, Amulet Books, 2015,  
Enchantment Lake, University of Minnesota Press, 2015,  
West of the Moon, Amulet Books, 2014,  
Shadow on The Mountain, Aumlet Books, 2012, 

 
The Peace Bell, Illustrator Hideko Takahashi, Henry Holt, 2008,  
Heart of a Samurai, Amulet Books, 2010,  

she was a runner up for the 2011 newbery medal and won the Asian/Pacific American award for literature.

References

External links

 
"Author Interview: Margi Preus, author of Heart of a Samurai", The Fourth Musketeer, July 24, 2010
"2010 Children's Best: Heart of a Samurai, by Margi Preus", Kirkus, Clayton Moore, November 15, 2010 

Margi Preus at Library of Congress Authorities — with 7 catalog records

American children's writers
Binghamton University alumni
Living people
Newbery Honor winners
Writers from Minnesota
20th-century American writers
21st-century American writers
20th-century American women writers
21st-century American women writers
Year of birth missing (living people)
Place of birth missing (living people)
American women children's writers